Smile for Me may refer to:
Films
Smile for Me, a 2007 Australian short film by Anna Fraser

Music
Smile for Me (album), 1974 studio album by country music singer Lynn Anderson
"Smile for Me" (Lynn Anderson song), 1974 single by Lynn Anderson
"Smile for Me" (The Tigers song), song composed by Barry and Maurice Gibb in 1968, and made popular by the Japanese band The Tigers
"Smile for Me" (Massari song), 2005 single by Canadian singer Massari and featuring the rapper Loon